Stephen Hales (1677–1761) was a clergyman and scientist.

Stephen Hales may also refer to:

Stephen Hales (MP for Norfolk) (died 1394/5), MP for Norfolk
Stephen Hales (died 1574), MP for Leicester

See also
Stephen Hale (disambiguation)